

Africa

President – Abdelaziz Bouteflika, President of Algeria (1999–2019)
Prime Minister –
Abdelaziz Belkhadem, Prime Minister of Algeria (2006–2008)
Ahmed Ouyahia, Prime Minister of Algeria (2008–2012)

President – José Eduardo dos Santos, President of Angola (1979–2017)
Prime Minister –
Fernando da Piedade Dias dos Santos, Prime Minister of Angola (2002–2008)
Paulo Kassoma, Prime Minister of Angola (2008–2010)

President – Thomas Boni Yayi, President of Benin (2006–2016)

President –
Festus Mogae, President of Botswana (1998–2008)
Ian Khama, President of Botswana (2008–2018)

President – Blaise Compaoré, President of Burkina Faso (1987–2014)
Prime Minister – Tertius Zongo, Prime Minister of Burkina Faso (2007–2011)

President – Pierre Nkurunziza, President of Burundi (2005–2020)

President – Paul Biya, President of Cameroon (1982–present)
Prime Minister – Ephraïm Inoni, Prime Minister of Cameroon (2004–2009)

President – Pedro Pires, President of Cape Verde (2001–2011)
Prime Minister – José Maria Neves, Prime Minister of Cape Verde (2001–2016)

President – François Bozizé, President of the Central African Republic (2003–2013)
Prime Minister –
Élie Doté, Prime Minister of the Central African Republic (2005–2008)
Faustin-Archange Touadéra, Prime Minister of the Central African Republic (2008–2013)

President – Idriss Déby, President of Chad (1990–2021)
Prime Minister –
Delwa Kassiré Koumakoye, Prime Minister of Chad (2007–2008)
Youssouf Saleh Abbas, Prime Minister of Chad (2008–2010)

President – Ahmed Abdallah Mohamed Sambi, President of the Comoros (2006–2011)

President – Denis Sassou Nguesso, President of the Republic of the Congo (1997–present)
Prime Minister – Isidore Mvouba, Prime Minister of the Republic of the Congo (2005–2009)

President – Joseph Kabila, President of the Democratic Republic of the Congo (2001–2019)
Prime Minister –
Antoine Gizenga, Prime Minister of the Democratic Republic of the Congo (2006–2008)
Adolphe Muzito, Prime Minister of the Democratic Republic of the Congo (2008–2012)

President – Ismaïl Omar Guelleh, President of Djibouti (1999–present)
Prime Minister – Dileita Mohamed Dileita, Prime Minister of Djibouti (2001–2013)

President – Hosni Mubarak, President of Egypt (1981–2011)
Prime Minister – Ahmed Nazif, Prime Minister of Egypt (2004–2011)

President – Teodoro Obiang Nguema Mbasogo, President of Equatorial Guinea (1979–present)
Prime Minister –
Ricardo Mangue Obama Nfubea, Prime Minister of Equatorial Guinea (2006–2008)
Ignacio Milam Tang, Prime Minister of Equatorial Guinea (2008–2012)

President – Isaias Afwerki, President of Eritrea (1991–present)

President – Girma Wolde-Giorgis, President of Ethiopia (2001–2013)
Prime Minister – Meles Zenawi, Prime Minister of Ethiopia (1995–2012)

President – Omar Bongo, President of Gabon (1967–2009)
Prime Minister – Jean Eyeghé Ndong, Prime Minister of Gabon (2006–2009)

President – Yahya Jammeh, President of the Gambia (1994–2017)

President – John Kufuor, President of Ghana (2001–2009)

President –
Lansana Conté, President of Guinea (1984–2008)
Aboubacar Somparé, Acting President of Guinea (2008)
Moussa Dadis Camara, President of Guinea (2008–2009)
Prime Minister –
Lansana Kouyaté, Prime Minister of Guinea (2007–2008)
Ahmed Tidiane Souaré, Prime Minister of Guinea (2008)
Kabiné Komara, Prime Minister of Guinea (2008–2010)

President – João Bernardo Vieira, President of Guinea-Bissau (2005–2009)
Prime Minister –
Martinho Ndafa Kabi, Prime Minister of Guinea-Bissau (2007–2008)
Carlos Correia, Prime Minister of Guinea-Bissau (2008–2009)

President – Laurent Gbagbo, President of the Ivory Coast (2000–2011)
Prime Minister – Guillaume Soro, Prime Minister of the Ivory Coast (2007–2012)

President – Mwai Kibaki, President of Kenya (2002–2013)
Prime Minister – Raila Odinga, Prime Minister of Kenya (2008–2013)

Monarch – Letsie III, King of Lesotho (1996–present)
Prime Minister – Pakalitha Mosisili, Prime Minister of Lesotho (1998–2012)

President – Ellen Johnson Sirleaf, President of Liberia (2006–2018)

De facto Head of State – Muammar Gaddafi, Guide of the Revolution of Libya (1969–2011)
De jure Head of State –
Muhammad az-Zanati, General Secretary of the General People's Congress of Libya (1992–2008)
Miftah Muhammed K'eba, General Secretary of the General People's Congress of Libya (2008–2009)
Prime Minister – Baghdadi Mahmudi, General Secretary of the General People's Committee of Libya (2006–2011)

President – Marc Ravalomanana, President of Madagascar (2002–2009)
Prime Minister – Charles Rabemananjara, Prime Minister of Madagascar (2007–2009)

President – Bingu wa Mutharika, President of Malawi (2004–2012)

President – Amadou Toumani Touré, President of Mali (2002–2012)
Prime Minister – Modibo Sidibé, Prime Minister of Mali (2007–2011)

Head of State –
Sidi Ould Cheikh Abdallahi, President of Mauritania (2007–2008)
Mohamed Ould Abdel Aziz, President of the High Council of State of Mauritania (2008–2009)
Prime Minister –
Zeine Ould Zeidane, Prime Minister of Mauritania (2007–2008)
Yahya Ould Ahmed El Waghef, Prime Minister of Mauritania (2008)
Moulaye Ould Mohamed Laghdaf, Prime Minister of Mauritania (2008–2014)

President – Sir Anerood Jugnauth, President of Mauritius (2003–2012)
Prime Minister – Navin Ramgoolam, Prime Minister of Mauritius (2005–2014)
  (overseas collectivity of France)
Prefect –
Vincent Bouvier, Prefect of Mayotte (2007–2008)
Denis Robin, Prefect of Mayotte (2008–2009)
Head of Government –
Saïd Omar Oili, President of the General Council of Mayotte (2004–2008)
Ahmed Attoumani Douchina, President of the General Council of Mayotte (2008–2011)

Monarch – Mohammed VI, King of Morocco (1999–present)
Prime Minister – Abbas El Fassi, Prime Minister of Morocco (2007–2011)
 (self-declared, partially recognised state)
President – Mohamed Abdelaziz, President of Western Sahara (1976–2016)
Prime Minister – Abdelkader Taleb Omar, Prime Minister of Western Sahara (2003–2018)

President – Armando Guebuza, President of Mozambique (2005–2015)
Prime Minister – Luísa Diogo, Prime Minister of Mozambique (2004–2010)

President – Hifikepunye Pohamba, President of Namibia (2005–2015)
Prime Minister – Nahas Angula, Prime Minister of Namibia (2005–2012)

President – Mamadou Tandja, President of Niger (1999–2010)
Prime Minister – Seyni Oumarou, Prime Minister of Niger (2007–2009)

President – Umaru Musa Yar'Adua, President of Nigeria (2007–2010)

President – Paul Kagame, President of Rwanda (2000–present)
Prime Minister – Bernard Makuza, Prime Minister of Rwanda (2000–2011)
 (Overseas Territory of the United Kingdom)
Governor – Andrew Gurr, Governor of Saint Helena (2007–2011)

President – Fradique de Menezes, President of São Tomé and Príncipe (2003–2011)
Prime Minister –
Tomé Vera Cruz, Prime Minister of São Tomé and Príncipe (2006–2008)
Patrice Trovoada, Prime Minister of São Tomé and Príncipe (2008)
Joaquim Rafael Branco, Prime Minister of São Tomé and Príncipe (2008–2010)

President – Abdoulaye Wade, President of Senegal (2000–2012)
Prime Minister – Cheikh Hadjibou Soumaré, Prime Minister of Senegal (2007–2009)

President – James Michel, President of Seychelles (2004–2016)

President – Ernest Bai Koroma, President of Sierra Leone (2007–2018)

President –
Abdullahi Yusuf Ahmed, President of Somalia (2004–2008)
Adan Mohamed Nuur Madobe, Acting President of Somalia (2008–2009)
Prime Minister – Nur Hassan Hussein, Prime Minister of Somalia (2007–2009)
 (unrecognised, secessionist state)
President – Dahir Riyale Kahin, President of Somaliland (2002–2010)
 (self-declared autonomous state)
President – Mohamud Muse Hersi, President of Puntland (2005–2009)
  (unrecognised, autonomous state)
President –
Jibrell Ali Salad, President of Maakhir (2007–2009)
Abdullahi Ahmed Jama, President of Maakhir (claimant, 2008–2009)

President –
Thabo Mbeki, President of South Africa (1999–2008)
Kgalema Motlanthe, President of South Africa (2008–2009)

President – Omar al-Bashir, President of Sudan (1989–2019)

Monarch – Mswati III, King of Swaziland (1986–present)
Prime Minister –
Themba Dlamini, Prime Minister of Swaziland (2003–2008)
Bheki Dlamini, Acting Prime Minister of Swaziland (2008)
Barnabas Sibusiso Dlamini, Prime Minister of Swaziland (2008–2018)

President – Jakaya Kikwete, President of Tanzania (2005–2015)
Prime Minister –
Edward Lowassa, Prime Minister of Tanzania (2005–2008)
Mizengo Pinda, Prime Minister of Tanzania (2008–2015)

President – Faure Gnassingbé, President of Togo (2005–present)
Prime Minister –
Komlan Mally, Prime Minister of Togo (2007–2008)
Gilbert Houngbo, Prime Minister of Togo (2008–2012)

President – Zine El Abidine Ben Ali, President of Tunisia (1987–2011)
Prime Minister – Mohamed Ghannouchi, Prime Minister of Tunisia (1999–2011)

President – Yoweri Museveni, President of Uganda (1986–present)
Prime Minister – Apolo Nsibambi, Prime Minister of Uganda (1999–2011)

President –
Levy Mwanawasa, President of Zambia (2002–2008)
Rupiah Banda, President of Zambia (2008–2011)

President – Robert Mugabe, President of Zimbabwe (1987–2017)

Asia

President – Hamid Karzai, President of Afghanistan (2002–2014)

Monarch – Sheikh Hamad bin Isa Al Khalifa, King of Bahrain (1999–present)
Prime Minister – Sheikh Khalifa bin Salman Al Khalifa, Prime Minister of Bahrain (1970–2020)

President – Iajuddin Ahmed, President of Bangladesh (2002–2009)
Prime Minister – Fakhruddin Ahmed, Chief Adviser of Bangladesh (2007–2009)

Monarch – Jigme Khesar Namgyel Wangchuck, King of Bhutan (2006–present)
Prime Minister –
Kinzang Dorji, Prime Minister of Bhutan (2007–2008)
Jigme Thinley, Prime Minister of Bhutan (2008–2013)

Monarch – Hassanal Bolkiah, Sultan of Brunei (1967–present)
Prime Minister – Hassanal Bolkiah, Prime Minister of Brunei (1984–present)

Monarch – Norodom Sihamoni, King of Cambodia (2004–present)
Prime Minister – Hun Sen, Prime Minister of Cambodia (1985–present)

Communist Party Leader – Hu Jintao, General Secretary of the Chinese Communist Party (2002–2012)
President – Hu Jintao, President of China (2003–2013)
Premier – Wen Jiabao, Premier of the State Council of China (2003–2013)

President –
José Ramos-Horta, President of East Timor (2007–2012)
Vicente Guterres, Acting President of East Timor (2008)
Fernando de Araújo, Acting President of East Timor (2008)
Prime Minister – Xanana Gusmão, Prime Minister of East Timor (2007–2015)

President – Pratibha Patil, President of India (2007–2012)
Prime Minister – Manmohan Singh, Prime Minister of India (2004–2014)

President – Susilo Bambang Yudhoyono, President of Indonesia (2004–2014)

Supreme Leader – Ayatollah Ali Khamenei, Supreme Leader of Iran (1989–present)
President – Mahmoud Ahmadinejad, President of Iran (2005–2013)
 
Head of State – Presidency Council of Iraq
Members – Jalal Talabani (2006–2010; President of Iraq, 2006–2010), and Adil Abdul-Mahdi and Tariq al-Hashimi (2006–2010)
Prime Minister – Nouri al-Maliki, Prime Minister of Iraq (2006–2014)

President – Shimon Peres, President of Israel (2007–2014)
Prime Minister – Ehud Olmert, Prime Minister of Israel (2006–2009)
 (non-state administrative authority)
President – Mahmoud Abbas, President of the Palestinian National Authority (in the West Bank) (2005–present)
Prime Minister – Salam Fayyad, Prime Minister of the Palestinian National Authority (in the West Bank) (2007–2013)
  Gaza Strip (rebelling against the Palestinian National Authority, in the West Bank)
Prime Minister – Ismail Haniyeh, Prime Minister of the Palestinian National Authority (in the Gaza Strip) (2007–2014)

Monarch – Akihito, Emperor of Japan (1989–2019)
Prime Minister –
Yasuo Fukuda, Prime Minister of Japan (2007–2008)
Tarō Asō, Prime Minister of Japan (2008–2009)

Monarch – Abdullah II, King of Jordan (1999–present)
Prime Minister – Nader al-Dahabi, Prime Minister of Jordan (2007–2009)

President – Nursultan Nazarbayev, President of Kazakhstan (1990–2019)
Prime Minister – Karim Massimov, Prime Minister of Kazakhstan (2007–2012)

Communist Party Leader – Kim Jong-il, General Secretary of the Workers' Party of Korea (1997–2011)
De facto Head of State – Kim Jong-il, Chairman of the National Defence Commission of North Korea (1993–2011)
De jure Head of State – Kim Yong-nam, Chairman of the Presidium of the Supreme People's Assembly of North Korea (1998–2019)
Premier – Kim Yong-il, Premier of the Cabinet of North Korea (2007–2010)

President –
Roh Moo-hyun, President of South Korea (2003–2008)
Lee Myung-bak, President of South Korea (2008–2013)
Prime Minister –
Han Duck-soo, Prime Minister of South Korea (2007–2008)
Han Seung-soo, Prime Minister of South Korea (2008–2009)

Monarch – Sheikh Sabah Al-Ahmad Al-Jaber Al-Sabah, Emir of Kuwait (2006–2020)
Prime Minister – Sheikh Nasser Al-Sabah, Prime Minister of Kuwait (2006–2011)

President – Kurmanbek Bakiyev, President of Kyrgyzstan (2005–2010)
Prime Minister – Igor Chudinov, Prime Minister of Kyrgyzstan (2007–2009)

Communist Party Leader – Choummaly Sayasone, General Secretary of the Lao People's Revolutionary Party (2006–2016)
President – Choummaly Sayasone, President of Laos (2006–2016)
Premier – Bouasone Bouphavanh, Chairman of the Council of Ministers of Laos (2006–2010)

President –
Fouad Siniora, Acting President of Lebanon (2007–2008)
Michel Suleiman, President of Lebanon (2008–2014)
Prime Minister – Fouad Siniora, President of the Council of Ministers of Lebanon (2005–2009)

Monarch – Tuanku Mizan Zainal Abidin, Yang di-Pertuan Agong of Malaysia (2006–2011)
Prime Minister – Abdullah Ahmad Badawi, Prime Minister of Malaysia (2003–2009)

President –
Maumoon Abdul Gayoom, President of the Maldives (1978–2008)
Mohamed Nasheed, President of the Maldives (2008–2012)

President – Nambaryn Enkhbayar, President of Mongolia (2005–2009)
Prime Minister – Sanjaagiin Bayar, Prime Minister of Mongolia (2007–2009)

Head of State – Than Shwe, Chairman of the State Peace and Development Council of Myanmar (1992–2011)
Prime Minister – Thein Sein, Prime Minister of Myanmar (2007–2011)

the Kingdom was superseded on 28 May
Monarch – Gyanendra, King of Nepal (2001–2008)
Head of State –
Girija Prasad Koirala, Acting Head of State of Nepal (2007–2008)
Ram Baran Yadav, President of Nepal (2008–2015)
Prime Minister –
Girija Prasad Koirala, Prime Minister of Nepal (2006–2008)
Pushpa Kamal Dahal, Prime Minister of Nepal (2008–2009)

Monarch – Qaboos bin Said al Said, Sultan of Oman (1970–2020)
Prime Minister – Qaboos bin Said al Said, Prime Minister of Oman (1972–2020)

President –
Pervez Musharraf, President of Pakistan (2001–2008)
Muhammad Mian Soomro, Acting President of Pakistan (2008)
Asif Ali Zardari, President of Pakistan (2008–2013)
Prime Minister –
Muhammad Mian Soomro, Prime Minister of Pakistan (2007–2008)
Yousaf Raza Gillani, Prime Minister of Pakistan (2008–2012)

President – Gloria Macapagal Arroyo, President of the Philippines (2001–2010)

Monarch – Sheikh Hamad bin Khalifa Al Thani, Emir of Qatar (1995–2013)
Prime Minister – Sheikh Hamad bin Jassim bin Jaber Al Thani, Prime Minister of Qatar (2007–2013)

Monarch – Abdullah, King of Saudi Arabia (2005–2015)
Prime Minister – Abdullah, Prime Minister of Saudi Arabia (2005–2015)

President – S. R. Nathan, President of Singapore (1999–2011)
Prime Minister – Lee Hsien Loong, Prime Minister of Singapore (2004–present)

President – Mahinda Rajapaksa, President of Sri Lanka (2005–2015)
Prime Minister – Ratnasiri Wickremanayake, Prime Minister of Sri Lanka (2005–2010)

President – Bashar al-Assad, President of Syria (2000–present)
Prime Minister – Muhammad Naji al-Otari, Prime Minister of Syria (2003–2011)

President –
Chen Shui-bian, President of Taiwan (2000–2008)
Ma Ying-jeou, President of Taiwan (2008–2016)
Premier –
Chang Chun-hsiung, President of the Executive Yuan of Taiwan (2007–2008)
Liu Chao-shiuan, President of the Executive Yuan of Taiwan (2008–2009)

President – Emomali Rahmon, President of Tajikistan (1992–present)
Prime Minister – Oqil Oqilov, Prime Minister of Tajikistan (1999–2013)

Monarch – Bhumibol Adulyadej, King of Thailand (1946–2016)
Prime Minister –
Surayud Chulanont, Prime Minister of Thailand (2006–2008)
Samak Sundaravej, Prime Minister of Thailand (2008)
Somchai Wongsawat, Prime Minister of Thailand (2008)
Chaovarat Chanweerakul, Acting Prime Minister of Thailand (2008)
Abhisit Vejjajiva, Prime Minister of Thailand (2008–2011)

President – Abdullah Gül, President of Turkey (2007–2014)
Prime Minister – Recep Tayyip Erdoğan, Prime Minister of Turkey (2003–2014)

President – Gurbanguly Berdimuhamedow, President of Turkmenistan (2006–2022)

President – Sheikh Khalifa bin Zayed Al Nahyan, President of the United Arab Emirates (2004–present)
Prime Minister – Sheikh Mohammed bin Rashid Al Maktoum, Prime Minister of the United Arab Emirates (2006–present)

President – Islam Karimov, President of Uzbekistan (1990–2016)
Prime Minister – Shavkat Mirziyoyev, Prime Minister of Uzbekistan (2003–2016)

Communist Party Leader – Nông Đức Mạnh, General Secretary of the Communist Party of Vietnam (2001–2011)
President – Nguyễn Minh Triết, President of Vietnam (2006–2011)
Prime Minister – Nguyễn Tấn Dũng, Prime Minister of Vietnam (2006–2016)

President – Ali Abdullah Saleh, President of Yemen (1978–2012)
Prime Minister – Ali Muhammad Mujawar, Prime Minister of Yemen (2007–2011)

Europe

President – Bamir Topi, President of Albania (2007–2012)
Prime Minister – Sali Berisha, Prime Minister of Albania (2005–2013)

Monarchs –
French Co-Prince – Nicolas Sarkozy, French Co-prince of Andorra (2007–2012)
Co-Prince's Representative –
Emmanuelle Mignon (2007–2008)
Christian Frémont (2008–2012)
Episcopal Co-Prince – Joan Enric Vives Sicília, Episcopal Co-prince of Andorra (2003–present)
Co-Prince's Representative – Nemesi Marqués Oste (1993–2012)
Prime Minister – Albert Pintat, Head of Government of Andorra (2005–2009)

President –
Robert Kocharyan, President of Armenia (1998–2008)
Serzh Sargsyan, President of Armenia (2008–2018)
Prime Minister –
Serzh Sargsyan, Prime Minister of Armenia (2007–2008)
Tigran Sargsyan, Prime Minister of Armenia (2008–2014)

President – Heinz Fischer, Federal President of Austria (2004–2016)
Chancellor –
Alfred Gusenbauer, Federal Chancellor of Austria (2007–2008)
Werner Faymann, Federal Chancellor of Austria (2008–2016)

President – Ilham Aliyev, President of Azerbaijan (2003–present)
Prime Minister – Artur Rasizade, Prime Minister of Azerbaijan (2003–2018)
 (unrecognised, secessionist state)
President – Bako Sahakyan, President of Nagorno-Karabakh (2007–2020)
Prime Minister – Arayik Harutyunyan, Prime Minister of Nagorno-Karabakh (2007–2017)

President – Alexander Lukashenko, President of Belarus (1994–present)
Prime Minister – Sergei Sidorsky, Prime Minister of Belarus (2003–2010)

Monarch – Albert II, King of the Belgians (1993–2013)
Prime Minister –
Guy Verhofstadt, Prime Minister of Belgium (1999–2008)
Yves Leterme, Prime Minister of Belgium (2008)
Herman Van Rompuy, Prime Minister of Belgium (2008–2009)

Head of State – Presidency of Bosnia and Herzegovina
Serb Member – Nebojša Radmanović (2006–2014; Chairman of the Presidency of Bosnia and Herzegovina, 2008–2009)
Bosniak Member – Haris Silajdžić (2006–2010; Chairman of the Presidency of Bosnia and Herzegovina, 2008)
Croat Member – Željko Komšić (2006–2014; Chairman of the Presidency of Bosnia and Herzegovina, 2007–2008)
Prime Minister – Nikola Špirić, Chairman of the Council of Ministers of Bosnia and Herzegovina, (2007–2012)
High Representative – Miroslav Lajčák, High Representative for Bosnia and Herzegovina (2007–2009)

President – Georgi Parvanov, President of Bulgaria (2002–2012)
Prime Minister – Sergei Stanishev, Prime Minister of Bulgaria (2005–2009)

President – Stjepan Mesić, President of Croatia (2000–2010)
Prime Minister – Ivo Sanader, Prime Minister of Croatia (2003–2009)

President –
Tassos Papadopoulos, President of Cyprus (2003–2008)
Demetris Christofias, President of Cyprus (2008–2013)
 (unrecognised, secessionist state)
President – Mehmet Ali Talat, President of Northern Cyprus (2005–2010)
Prime Minister – Ferdi Sabit Soyer, Prime Minister of Northern Cyprus (2005–2009)

President – Václav Klaus, President of the Czech Republic (2003–2013)
Prime Minister – Mirek Topolánek, Prime Minister of the Czech Republic (2006–2009)

Monarch – Margrethe II, Queen of Denmark (1972–present)
Prime Minister – Anders Fogh Rasmussen, Prime Minister of Denmark (2001–2009)

President – Toomas Hendrik Ilves, President of Estonia (2006–2016)
Prime Minister – Andrus Ansip, Prime Minister of Estonia (2005–2014)

President – Tarja Halonen, President of Finland (2000–2012)
Prime Minister – Matti Vanhanen, Prime Minister of Finland (2003–2010)

President – Nicolas Sarkozy, President of France (2007–2012)
Prime Minister – François Fillon, Prime Minister of France (2007–2012)

President –
Nino Burjanadze, Acting President of Georgia (2007–2008)
Mikheil Saakashvili, President of Georgia (2008–2013)
Prime Minister –
Lado Gurgenidze, Prime Minister of Georgia (2007–2008)
Grigol Mgaloblishvili, Prime Minister of Georgia (2008–2009)
 (partially recognised, secessionist state)
President – Sergei Bagapsh, President of Abkhazia (2005–2011)
Prime Minister – Aleksander Ankvab, Prime Minister of Abkhazia (2005–2010)
 (partially recognised, secessionist state)
President – Eduard Kokoity, President of South Ossetia (2001–2011)
Prime Minister –
Yury Morozov, Prime Minister of South Ossetia (2005–2008)
Boris Chochiev, Acting Prime Minister of South Ossetia (2008)
Aslanbek Bulatsev, Prime Minister of South Ossetia (2008–2009)

President – Horst Köhler, Federal President of Germany (2004–2010)
Chancellor – Angela Merkel, Federal Chancellor of Germany (2005–2021)

President – Karolos Papoulias, President of Greece (2005–2015)
Prime Minister – Kostas Karamanlis, Prime Minister of Greece (2004–2009)

President – László Sólyom, President of Hungary (2005–2010)
Prime Minister – Ferenc Gyurcsány, Prime Minister of Hungary (2004–2009)

President – Ólafur Ragnar Grímsson, President of Iceland (1996–2016)
Prime Minister – Geir Haarde, Prime Minister of Iceland (2006–2009)

President – Mary McAleese, President of Ireland (1997–2011)
Prime Minister –
Bertie Ahern, Taoiseach of Ireland (1997–2008)
Brian Cowen, Taoiseach of Ireland (2008–2011)

President – Giorgio Napolitano, President of Italy (2006–2015)
Prime Minister –
Romano Prodi, President of the Council of Ministers of Italy (2006–2008)
Silvio Berlusconi, President of the Council of Ministers of Italy (2008–2011)

President – Valdis Zatlers, President of Latvia (2007–2011)
Prime Minister – Ivars Godmanis, Prime Minister of Latvia (2007–2009)

Monarch – Hans-Adam II, Prince Regnant of Liechtenstein (1989–present)
Regent – Hereditary Prince Alois, Regent of Liechtenstein (2004–present)
Prime Minister – Otmar Hasler, Head of Government of Liechtenstein (2001–2009)

President – Valdas Adamkus, President of Lithuania (2004–2009)
Prime Minister –
Gediminas Kirkilas, Prime Minister of Lithuania (2006–2008)
Andrius Kubilius, Prime Minister of Lithuania (2008–2012)

Monarch – Henri, Grand Duke of Luxembourg (2000–present)
Prime Minister – Jean-Claude Juncker, Prime Minister of Luxembourg (1995–2013)

President – Branko Crvenkovski, President of Macedonia (2004–2009)
Prime Minister – Nikola Gruevski, President of the Government of Macedonia (2006–2016)

President – Eddie Fenech Adami, President of Malta (2004–2009)
Prime Minister – Lawrence Gonzi, Prime Minister of Malta (2004–2013)

President – Vladimir Voronin, President of Moldova (2001–2009)
Prime Minister –
Vasile Tarlev, Prime Minister of Moldova (2001–2008)
Zinaida Greceanîi, Prime Minister of Moldova (2008–2009)
 (unrecognised, secessionist state)
President – Igor Smirnov, President of Transnistria (1990–2011)

Monarch – Albert II, Sovereign Prince of Monaco (2005–present)
Prime Minister – Jean-Paul Proust, Minister of State of Monaco (2005–2010)

President – Filip Vujanović, President of Montenegro (2002–2018)
Prime Minister –
Željko Šturanović, President of the Government of Montenegro (2006–2008)
Milo Đukanović, President of the Government of Montenegro (2008–2010)

Monarch – Beatrix, Queen of the Netherlands (1980–2013)
 (constituent country of the Kingdom of the Netherlands)
Prime Minister – Jan Peter Balkenende, Prime Minister of the Netherlands (2002–2010)
 (constituent country of the Kingdom of the Netherlands)
see 
 (constituent country of the Kingdom of the Netherlands)
see 

Monarch – Harald V, King of Norway (1991–present)
Prime Minister – Jens Stoltenberg, Prime Minister of Norway (2005–2013)

President – Lech Kaczyński, President of Poland (2005–2010)
Prime Minister – Donald Tusk, Chairman of the Council of Ministers of Poland (2007–2014)

President – Aníbal Cavaco Silva, President of Portugal (2006–2016)
Prime Minister – José Sócrates, Prime Minister of Portugal (2005–2011)

President – Traian Băsescu, President of Romania (2004–2014)
Prime Minister –
Călin Popescu-Tăriceanu, Prime Minister of Romania (2004–2008)
Emil Boc, Prime Minister of Romania (2008–2012)

President –
Vladimir Putin, President of Russia (1999–2008)
Dmitry Medvedev, President of Russia (2008–2012)
Prime Minister –
Viktor Zubkov, Chairman of the Government of Russia (2007–2008)
Vladimir Putin, Chairman of the Government of Russia (2008–2012)

Captains-Regent –
Mirko Tomassoni and Alberto Selva, Captains Regent of San Marino (2007–2008)
Rosa Zafferani and Federico Pedini Amati, Captains Regent of San Marino (2008)
Ernesto Benedettini and Assunta Meloni, Captains Regent of San Marino (2008–2009)

President – Boris Tadić, President of Serbia (2004–2012)
Prime Minister –
Vojislav Koštunica, President of the Government of Serbia (2004–2008)
Mirko Cvetković, President of the Government of Serbia (2008–2012)
 (partially recognised, secessionist state; under nominal international administration)
declared independence on 17 February
President – Fatmir Sejdiu, President of Kosovo (2006–2010)
Prime Minister –
Agim Çeku, Prime Minister of Kosovo (2006–2008)
Hashim Thaçi, Prime Minister of Kosovo (2008–2014)
UN Special Representative –
Joachim Rücker, Special Representative of the UN Secretary-General for Kosovo (2006–2008)
Lamberto Zannier, Special Representative of the UN Secretary-General for Kosovo (2008–2011)

President – Ivan Gašparovič, President of Slovakia (2004–2014)
Prime Minister – Robert Fico, Prime Minister of Slovakia (2006–2010)

President – Danilo Türk, President of Slovenia (2007–2012)
Prime Minister –
Janez Janša, Prime Minister of Slovenia (2004–2008)
Borut Pahor, Prime Minister of Slovenia (2008–2012)

Monarch – Juan Carlos I, King of Spain (1975–2014)
Prime Minister – José Luis Rodríguez Zapatero, President of the Government of Spain (2004–2011)

Monarch – Carl XVI Gustaf, King of Sweden (1973–present)
Prime Minister – Fredrik Reinfeldt, Prime Minister of Sweden (2006–2014)

Council – Federal Council of Switzerland
Members – Moritz Leuenberger (1995–2010), Pascal Couchepin (1998–2009; President of Switzerland, 2008), Samuel Schmid (2000–2008), Micheline Calmy-Rey (2002–2011), Hans-Rudolf Merz (2003–2010), Doris Leuthard (2006–present), and Eveline Widmer-Schlumpf (2008–2015)

President – Viktor Yushchenko, President of Ukraine (2005–2010)
Prime Minister – Yulia Tymoshenko, Prime Minister of Ukraine (2007–2010)

Monarch – Elizabeth II, Queen of the United Kingdom (1952–present)
Prime Minister – Gordon Brown, Prime Minister of the United Kingdom (2007–2010)
 (Crown dependency of the United Kingdom)
Lieutenant-Governor – Sir Paul Haddacks, Lieutenant Governor of the Isle of Man (2005–2011)
Chief Minister – Tony Brown, Chief Minister of the Isle of Man (2006–2011)
 (Crown dependency of the United Kingdom)
Lieutenant-Governor – Sir Fabian Malbon, Lieutenant Governor of Guernsey (2005–2011)
Chief Minister –
Mike Torode, Chief Minister of Guernsey (2007–2008)
Lyndon Trott, Chief Minister of Guernsey (2008–2012)
 (Crown dependency of the United Kingdom)
Lieutenant-Governor – Andrew Ridgway, Lieutenant Governor of Jersey (2006–2011)
Chief Minister –
Frank Walker, Chief Minister of Jersey (2005–2008)
Terry Le Sueur, Chief Minister of Jersey (2008–2011)
 (Overseas Territory of the United Kingdom)
Governor – Sir Robert Fulton, Governor of Gibraltar (2006–2009)
Chief Minister – Peter Caruana, Chief Minister of Gibraltar (1996–2011)

Monarch – Pope Benedict XVI, Sovereign of Vatican City (2005–2013)
Head of Government – Cardinal Giovanni Lajolo, President of the Governorate of Vatican City (2006–2011)
Holy See (sui generis subject of public international law)
Secretary of State – Cardinal Tarcisio Bertone, Cardinal Secretary of State (2006–2013)

North America
 (Overseas Territory of the United Kingdom)
Governor – Andrew George, Governor of Anguilla (2006–2009)
Chief Minister – Osbourne Fleming, Chief Minister of Anguilla (2000–2010)

Monarch – Elizabeth II, Queen of Antigua and Barbuda (1981–present)
Governor-General – Dame Louise Lake-Tack, Governor-General of Antigua and Barbuda (2007–2014)
Prime Minister – Baldwin Spencer, Prime Minister of Antigua and Barbuda (2004–2014)
 (constituent country of the Kingdom of the Netherlands)
Governor – Fredis Refunjol, Governor of Aruba (2004–2016)
Prime Minister – Nelson Oduber, Prime Minister of Aruba (2001–2009)

Monarch – Elizabeth II, Queen of the Bahamas (1973–present)
Governor-General – Arthur Dion Hanna, Governor-General of the Bahamas (2006–2010)
Prime Minister – Hubert Ingraham, Prime Minister of the Bahamas (2007–2012)

Monarch – Elizabeth II, Queen of Barbados (1966–2021)
Governor-General – Sir Clifford Husbands, Governor-General of Barbados (1996–2011)
Prime Minister –
Owen Arthur, Prime Minister of Barbados (1994–2008)
David Thompson, Prime Minister of Barbados (2008–2010)

Monarch – Elizabeth II, Queen of Belize (1981–present)
Governor-General – Sir Colville Young, Governor-General of Belize (1993–2021)
Prime Minister –
Said Musa, Prime Minister of Belize (1998–2008)
Dean Barrow, Prime Minister of Belize (2008–2020)
 (Overseas Territory of the United Kingdom)
Governor – Sir Richard Gozney, Governor of Bermuda (2007–2012)
Premier – Ewart Brown, Premier of Bermuda (2006–2010)
 (Overseas Territory of the United Kingdom)
Governor – David Pearey, Governor of the British Virgin Islands (2006–2010)
Premier – Ralph T. O'Neal, Premier of the British Virgin Islands (2007–2011)

Monarch – Elizabeth II, Queen of Canada (1952–present)
Governor-General – Michaëlle Jean, Governor General of Canada (2005–2010)
Prime Minister – Stephen Harper, Prime Minister of Canada (2006–2015)
 (Overseas Territory of the United Kingdom)
Governor – Stuart Jack, Governor of the Cayman Islands (2005–2009)
Head of Government – Kurt Tibbetts, Leader of Government Business of the Cayman Islands (2005–2009)

President – Óscar Arias, President of Costa Rica (2006–2010)

Communist Party Leader –
 Fidel Castro, First Secretary of the Communist Party of Cuba (1965–2011)
 Raúl Castro, Acting First Secretary of the Communist Party of Cuba (2006–2011)
President –
Fidel Castro, President of the Council of State of Cuba (1976–2008)
Raúl Castro, Acting President of the Council of State of Cuba (2006–2008), President of the Council of State of Cuba (2008–2018)
Prime Minister –
Fidel Castro, President of the Council of Ministers of Cuba (1959–2008)
Raúl Castro, Acting President of the Council of Ministers of Cuba (2006–2008), President of the Council of Ministers of Cuba (2008–2018)

President – Nicholas Liverpool, President of Dominica (2003–2012)
Prime Minister – Roosevelt Skerrit, Prime Minister of Dominica (2004–present)

President – Leonel Fernández, President of the Dominican Republic (2004–2012)

President – Antonio Saca, President of El Salvador (2004–2009)

Monarch – Elizabeth II, Queen of Grenada (1974–present)
Governor-General –
Sir Daniel Williams, Governor-General of Grenada (1996–2008)
Carlyle Glean, Governor-General of Grenada (2008–2013)
Prime Minister –
Keith Mitchell, Prime Minister of Grenada (1995–2008)
Tillman Thomas, Prime Minister of Grenada (2008–2013)

President –
Óscar Berger, President of Guatemala (2004–2008)
Álvaro Colom, President of Guatemala (2008–2012)

President – René Préval, President of Haiti (2006–2011)
Prime Minister –
Jacques-Édouard Alexis, Prime Minister of Haiti (2006–2008)
Michèle Pierre-Louis, Prime Minister of Haiti (2008–2009)

President – Manuel Zelaya, President of Honduras (2006–2009)

Monarch – Elizabeth II, Queen of Jamaica (1962–present)
Governor-General – Sir Kenneth O. Hall, Governor-General of Jamaica (2006–2009)
Prime Minister – Bruce Golding, Prime Minister of Jamaica (2007–2011)

President – Felipe Calderón, President of Mexico (2006–2012)
 (Overseas Territory of the United Kingdom)
Governor – Peter Waterworth, Governor of Montserrat (2007–2011)
Chief Minister – Lowell Lewis, Chief Minister of Montserrat (2006–2009)
 (constituent country of the Kingdom of the Netherlands)
Governor – Frits Goedgedrag, Governor of the Netherlands Antilles (2002–2010)
Prime Minister – Emily de Jongh-Elhage, Prime Minister of the Netherlands Antilles (2006–2010)

President – Daniel Ortega, President of Nicaragua (2007–present)

President – Martín Torrijos, President of Panama (2004–2009)
  (overseas collectivity of France)
Prefect – Dominique Lacroix, Prefect of Saint Barthélemy (2007–2009)
Head of Government – Bruno Magras, President of the Territorial Council of Saint Barthélemy (2007–present)

Monarch – Elizabeth II, Queen of Saint Kitts and Nevis (1983–present)
Governor-General – Sir Cuthbert Sebastian, Governor-General of Saint Kitts and Nevis (1996–2013)
Prime Minister – Denzil Douglas, Prime Minister of Saint Kitts and Nevis (1995–2015)

Monarch – Elizabeth II, Queen of Saint Lucia (1979–present)
Governor-General – Dame Pearlette Louisy, Governor-General of Saint Lucia (1997–2017)
Prime Minister – Stephenson King, Prime Minister of Saint Lucia (2007–2011)
 (overseas collectivity of France)
Prefect – Dominique Lacroix, Prefect of Saint Martin (2007–2009)
Head of Government –
Louis Constant Fleming, President of the Territorial Council of Saint Martin (2007–2008)
Marthe Ogoundélé, Acting President of the Territorial Council of Saint Martin (2008)
Frantz Gumbs, President of the Territorial Council of Saint Martin (2008–2009)
  (overseas collectivity of France)
Prefect –
Yves Fauqueur, Prefect of Saint Pierre and Miquelon (2006–2008)
Jean-Pierre Berçot, Prefect of Saint Pierre and Miquelon (2008–2009)
Head of Government – Stéphane Artano, President of the Territorial Council of Saint Pierre and Miquelon (2006–2018)

Monarch – Elizabeth II, Queen of Saint Vincent and the Grenadines (1979–present)
Governor-General – Sir Frederick Ballantyne, Governor-General of Saint Vincent and the Grenadines (2002–2019)
Prime Minister – Ralph Gonsalves, Prime Minister of Saint Vincent and the Grenadines (2001–present)

President – George Maxwell Richards, President of Trinidad and Tobago (2003–2013)
Prime Minister – Patrick Manning, Prime Minister of Trinidad and Tobago (2001–2010)
 (Overseas Territory of the United Kingdom)
Governor –
Richard Tauwhare, Governor of the Turks and Caicos Islands (2005–2008)
Mahala Wynns, Acting Governor of the Turks and Caicos Islands (2008)
Gordon Wetherell, Governor of the Turks and Caicos Islands (2008–2011)
Premier – Michael Misick, Premier of the Turks and Caicos Islands (2003–2009)

President – George W. Bush, President of the United States (2001–2009)
 (Commonwealth of the United States)
Governor – Aníbal Acevedo Vilá, Governor of Puerto Rico (2005–2009)
 (insular area of the United States)
Governor – John de Jongh, Governor of the United States Virgin Islands (2007–2015)

Oceania
 (unorganised, unincorporated territory of the United States)
Governor – Togiola Tulafono, Governor of American Samoa (2003–2013)

Monarch – Elizabeth II, Queen of Australia (1952–present)
Governor-General –
Michael Jeffery, Governor-General of Australia (2003–2008)
Quentin Bryce, Governor-General of Australia (2008–2014)
Prime Minister – Kevin Rudd, Prime Minister of Australia (2007–2010)
 (external territory of Australia)
Administrator –
Neil Lucas, Administrator of Christmas Island (2006–2008)
Julian Yates, Acting administrator of Christmas Island (2008)
Sheryl Klaffer, Acting administrator of Christmas Island (2008–2009)
Shire-President – Gordon Thomson, Shire president of Christmas Island (2003–2011)
 (external territory of Australia)
Administrator –
Neil Lucas, Administrator of the Cocos (Keeling) Islands (2006–2008)
Julian Yates, Acting Administrator of the Cocos (Keeling) Islands (2008)
Sheryl Klaffer, Acting Administrator of the Cocos (Keeling) Islands (2008–2009)
Shire-President – Mohammad Said Chongkin, Shire president of the Cocos (Keeling) Islands (2007–2009)
 (self-governing territory of Australia)
Administrator – Owen Walsh, Administrator of Norfolk Island (2007–2012)
Chief Minister – Andre Nobbs, Chief Minister of Norfolk Island (2007–2010)

President – Ratu Josefa Iloilo, President of Fiji (2007–2009)
Prime Minister – Frank Bainimarama, Prime Minister of Fiji (2007–present)
  (overseas collectivity of France)
High Commissioner –
Anne Bouquet, High Commissioner of the Republic in French Polynesia (2005–2008)
Éric Spitz, Acting High Commissioner of the Republic in French Polynesia (2008)
Adolphe Colrat, High Commissioner of the Republic in French Polynesia (2008–2011)
President –
Oscar Temaru, President of French Polynesia (2007–2008)
Gaston Flosse, President of French Polynesia (2008)
Gaston Tong Sang, President of French Polynesia (2008–2009)
 (insular area of the United States)
Governor – Felix Perez Camacho, Governor of Guam (2003–2011)

President – Anote Tong, President of Kiribati (2003–2016)

President –
Kessai Note, President of the Marshall Islands (2000–2008)
Litokwa Tomeing, President of the Marshall Islands (2008–2009)

President – Manny Mori, President of Micronesia (2007–2015)

President – Marcus Stephen, President of Nauru (2007–2011)
 (sui generis collectivity of France)
High Commissioner – Yves Dassonville, High Commissioner of New Caledonia (2007–2010)
Head of Government – Harold Martin, President of the Government of New Caledonia (2007–2009)

Monarch – Elizabeth II, Queen of New Zealand (1952–present)
Governor-General – Sir Anand Satyanand, Governor-General of New Zealand (2006–2011)
Prime Minister –
Helen Clark, Prime Minister of New Zealand (1999–2008)
John Key, Prime Minister of New Zealand (2008–2016)
 (associated state of New Zealand)
Queen's Representative – Sir Frederick Tutu Goodwin, Queen's Representative of the Cook Islands (2001–2013)
Prime Minister – Jim Marurai, Prime Minister of the Cook Islands (2004–2010)
 (associated state of New Zealand)
Premier –
Young Vivian, Premier of Niue (2002–2008)
Toke Talagi, Premier of Niue (2008–present)
Tokelau (dependent territory of New Zealand)
Administrator – David Payton, Administrator of Tokelau (2006–2009)
Head of Government –
Kuresa Nasau, Head of Government of Tokelau (2007–2008)
Pio Tuia, Head of Government of Tokelau (2008–2009)
 (Commonwealth of the United States)
Governor – Benigno Fitial, Governor of the Northern Mariana Islands (2006–2013)

President – Tommy Remengesau, President of Palau (2001–2009)

Monarch – Elizabeth II, Queen of Papua New Guinea (1975–present)
Governor-General – Sir Paulias Matane, Governor-General of Papua New Guinea (2004–2010)
Prime Minister – Sir Michael Somare, Prime Minister of Papua New Guinea (2002–2010)
 (Overseas Territory of the United Kingdom)
Governor – George Fergusson, Governor of the Pitcairn Islands (2006–2010)
Mayor – Mike Warren, Mayor of the Pitcairn Islands (2008–2013)

Head of State – Tufuga Efi, O le Ao o le Malo of Samoa (2007–2017)
Prime Minister – Tuilaepa Aiono Sailele Malielegaoi, Prime Minister of Samoa (1998–2021)

Monarch – Elizabeth II, Queen of the Solomon Islands (1978–present)
Governor-General – Sir Nathaniel Waena, Governor-General of the Solomon Islands (2004–2009)
Prime Minister – Derek Sikua, Prime Minister of the Solomon Islands (2007–2010)

Monarch – George Tupou V, King of Tonga (2006–2012)
Prime Minister – Feleti Sevele, Prime Minister of Tonga (2006–2010)

Monarch – Elizabeth II, Queen of Tuvalu (1978–present)
Governor-General – Sir Filoimea Telito, Governor-General of Tuvalu (2005–2010)
Prime Minister – Apisai Ielemia, Prime Minister of Tuvalu (2006–2010)

President – Kalkot Mataskelekele, President of Vanuatu (2004–2009)
Prime Minister –
Ham Lini, Prime Minister of Vanuatu (2004–2008)
Edward Natapei, Prime Minister of Vanuatu (2008–2010)
  (overseas collectivity of France)
Administrator –
Richard Didier, Administrator Superior of Wallis and Futuna (2006–2008)
Philippe Paolantoni, Administrator Superior of Wallis and Futuna (2008–2010)
Head of Government – Victor Brial, President of the Territorial Assembly of Wallis and Futuna (2007–2010)

South America

President – Cristina Fernández de Kirchner, President of Argentina (2007–2015)

President – Evo Morales, President of Bolivia (2006–2019)

President – Luiz Inácio Lula da Silva, President of Brazil (2003–2010)

President – Michelle Bachelet, President of Chile (2006–2010)

President – Álvaro Uribe, President of Colombia (2002–2010)

President – Rafael Correa, President of Ecuador (2007–2017)
 (Overseas Territory of the United Kingdom)
Governor – Alan Huckle, Governor of the Falkland Islands (2006–2010)
Head of Government –
Michael Blanch, Chief Executive of the Falkland Islands (2007–2008)
Tim Thorogood, Chief Executive of the Falkland Islands (2008–2012)

President – Bharrat Jagdeo, President of Guyana (1999–2011)
Prime Minister – Sam Hinds, Prime Minister of Guyana (1999–2015)

President –
Nicanor Duarte, President of Paraguay (2003–2008)
Fernando Lugo, President of Paraguay (2008–2012)

President – Alan García, President of Peru (2006–2011)
Prime Minister –
Jorge Del Castillo, President of the Council of Ministers of Peru (2006–2008)
Yehude Simon, President of the Council of Ministers of Peru (2008–2009)

President – Ronald Venetiaan, President of Suriname (2000–2010)

President – Tabaré Vázquez, President of Uruguay (2005–2010)

President – Hugo Chávez, President of Venezuela (2002–2013)

Notes

External links
Rulersa list of rulers throughout time and places
WorldStatesmenan online encyclopedia of the leaders of nations and territories

State leaders
State leaders
State leaders
2008